Lawrence Edward Roberts III (born October 20, 1982) is an American former professional basketball player.

College career
Roberts attended Baylor University for two seasons, where he made the Big 12 All-Freshman Team, but transferred to Mississippi State University in 2003 following the basketball scandal that rocked Baylor's program that year. He was a first-team All-American and the SEC Player of the Year in 2004, leading Mississippi State to its first top-two seeding in the NCAA tournament. In the 2003–04 season he averaged 16.9 points and 10.1 rebounds. He was first-team All-SEC and a first-team All-American, finishing third to Jameer Nelson and Emeka Okafor for national player of the year honors. In the 2004–05 season he averaged 16.9 points and 11 rebounds. He recorded the first triple-double in Mississippi State history against Nicholls State University with 18 points, 11 rebounds, and 12 assists, while wearing an irritating translucent plastic face mask to protect his broken nose.

Professional career

NBA
Roberts was a second round draft pick (55th overall) of the Seattle SuperSonics in the 2005 NBA draft, but was traded to the Memphis Grizzlies in exchange for two future second round draft picks and cash considerations. He was signed to a contract on July 10, 2005.

Europe
After two seasons with the Grizzlies, in July 2007, Roberts moved to Europe and signed with Greek powerhouse Olympiacos on a two-year deal. However, in October 2007, he was released from his contract before the season started.

Without a club and not playing competitive basketball for several months, Roberts was signed by Serbian team KK Crvena zvezda on September 17, 2008, to a one-year contract.

On September 25, 2009, Roberts was signed to the Indiana Pacers training camp roster, but got released less than a month later on October 19, 2009.

Two days later, October 21, 2009, Roberts signed a one-year contract with KK Partizan. With Partizan he won the 2009–10 Serbian National Championship, the 2010 Serbian National Cup, the 2010 Adriatic League and took 4th place at the Euroleague's Final Four in Paris.

In July 2010, Roberts signed with the Turkish team Efes Pilsen.

On July 12, 2011, Roberts signed with BC Lietuvos rytas.

In July 2012, he signed with Bayern Munich. In October 2013, he signed with Darüşşafaka of the TBL2.

On October 2, 2014, Roberts signed with BCM Gravelines of the French LNB Pro A averaging 4.7 points and 4.9 rebounds. On February 4, 2015, Roberts left the team citing personal reasons.

Career statistics

NBA

Regular season

|-
| align="left" | 2005–06
| align="left" | Memphis
| 33 || 0 || 5.5 || .455 || .000 || .478 || 1.5 || .2 || .2 || .1 || 1.5
|-
| align="left" | 2006–07
| align="left" | Memphis
| 54 || 18 || 17.9 || .452 || .000 || .725 || 4.8 || .6 || .7 || .2 || 5.2
|- class="sortbottom"
| style="text-align:center;" colspan="2"| Career
| 87 || 18 || 13.2 || .452 || .000 || .688 || 3.6 || .4 || .5 || .2 || 3.8

Euroleague

|-
| align="left" | 2009–10
| align="left" | Partizan Belgrade
| 21 || 21 || 32.2 || .335 || .319 || .658 || 7.4 || 2.3 || 1.1 || .3 || 9.0 || 10.0
|-
| align="left" | 2010–11
| align="left" | Efes Pilsen
| 16 || 3 || 20.9 || .435 || .379 || .594 || 5.1 || .8 || .9 || .6 || 6.5 || 7.5
|- class="sortbottom"
| style="text-align:center;" colspan="2"| Career
| 37 || 24 || 27.3 || .368 || .337 || .640 || 6.4 || 1.6 || 1.0 || .5 || 7.9 || 8.9

Personal

Roberts is the son of Lawrence E. "Butch" Jr., and Cynthia Roberts, nephew of former sportscaster Robin Roberts of Good Morning America fame and grandson of the late Col. Lawrence E. Roberts, Sr and Lucimarian Roberts.

References

External links
 Lawrence Roberts at eurobasket.com
 Lawrence Roberts at euroleague.net
 Lawrence Roberts at basketball-Reference.com
 Lawrence Roberts at fiba.com

1982 births
Living people
ABA League players
African-American basketball players
All-American college men's basketball players
American expatriate basketball people in France
American expatriate basketball people in Germany
American expatriate basketball people in Greece
American expatriate basketball people in Lithuania
American expatriate basketball people in Serbia
American expatriate basketball people in Turkey
American men's basketball players
Anadolu Efes S.K. players
Arkansas RimRockers players
Basketball players from Houston
Baylor Bears men's basketball players
BC Rytas players
BCM Gravelines players
Darüşşafaka Basketbol players
FC Bayern Munich basketball players
KK Crvena zvezda players
KK Partizan players
Lamar High School (Houston, Texas) alumni
Memphis Grizzlies players
Mississippi State Bulldogs men's basketball players
Olympiacos B.C. players
Power forwards (basketball)
Seattle SuperSonics draft picks
21st-century African-American sportspeople
20th-century African-American people